Jean-Loup Passek (29 July 1936 – 4 December 2016) was a French film critic. He was the director of cinematic collections at the Centre Georges Pompidou, and he author of several books about cinema.

Early life
Jean-Loup Passek was born on 29 July 1936 in Boulogne-Billancourt near Paris. He was of Slavic descent. He inherited the merry-go-round in the Jardin du Luxembourg.

Passek graduated from the University of Paris, where he earned a bachelor of arts degree in history and geography.

Career
Passek began his career as a poet.

Passek was the editor of all articles on geography in Petit Larousse from 1963 to 1985. Passek authored several books of cinematic criticism, including the Dictionnaire du cinéma published by Éditions Larousse. In 1978, he became the director of cinematic collections at the Centre Georges Pompidou.

Passek worked on the La Rochelle International Film Festival from 1977 onwards. Under his leadership, the film festival focused on comparing films rather than ranking them through competition. A year later, in 1978, he worked on the Cannes Film Festival, where he launched the Caméra d'Or with Gilles Jacob.

Passek established the Museu de Cinema de Melgaço Jean Loup Passek in Melgaço, Portugal.

Death
Passek died on 4 December 2016. He was 80 years old.

Works

Poetry

Film criticism

References

1936 births
2016 deaths
People from Boulogne-Billancourt
University of Paris alumni
20th-century French poets
French male poets
French film critics
20th-century French male writers
French male non-fiction writers